Mykola Borysovych Makhynia (1912 – 1990) was a Soviet and Ukrainian football player and coach. He is Merited Master of Sports of the Soviet Union (1946) and Merited Coach of the Ukrainian SSR (1962), the author of the first goal for Dynamo Kyiv in the Soviet Top League.

He was born in a family of river captain-instructor Borys Kasianovych Makhynia who eventually commanded big steamboats along Dnieper. Mykola was the youngest and had two brothers Andriy and Ivan and a sister Yevdokia. Talent for football appeared in all brother, but only Mykola was able to reach the highest level. If Andriy eventually left football and the highest achievement for Ivan was participations in games of the Kyiv championship in 1920s, Mykola passed all the levels that led to football heights.

Already in 1925 (or 1926) Mykola started to play for teams of local agency "Raikomvod" (or as they were simply called "Vodnyki).

References

External links
  Profile
 Today Mykola Makhynia would have turned 105 (Сьогодні Миколі МАХИНІ виповнилося б 105 років). FC Dynamo Kyiv. 30 November 2017

1912 births
1990 deaths
People from Cherkasy Oblast
People from Kanevsky Uyezd
Soviet Top League players
FC Dynamo Kyiv players
FC Dynamo Kazan players
FC Dynamo Kyiv managers
FC CSKA Kyiv managers
Ukrainian footballers
Soviet footballers
Honoured Masters of Sport of the USSR
Merited Coaches of Ukraine
Association football forwards
Ukrainian football managers
Soviet football managers
Sportspeople from Cherkasy Oblast